Goler Heights, also known simply as Goler, is an unincorporated community in Kern County, California. The town is named after John Goller (or Goler), a German immigrant who discovered a placer gold deposit that was later mined and named in his honor.

References

Unincorporated communities in Kern County, California
Unincorporated communities in California